May refer to
 any of the Prime Meridians that have been used, are used, or are proposed
 Greenwich Meridian established by the International Meridian Conference
 IERS Reference Meridian